Khao kan chin, khao ngiao, or chin som ngiao, also known as a steamed pudding with rice, is a dish from Northern Thailand. It is rice mixed with minced pork and pork blood, flavored with salt, sugar, a little of garlic, shallot, vegetable oil, and then steamed inside a banana leaf. It is commonly served with fried chopped garlic, fried dried bird chilies, and cucumber.

Etymology
In Northern Thailand, the word kan means 'squeeze' and chin means 'meat'. It is believed to be an origin of a dish name according to the cooking method.

History
Khao kan chin was originally a dish from Tai Yai ethnic before widespread to Lanna Kingdom or the Northern Thailand of Thailand. It is sometimes called khao ngiao because in ancient time, Lanna ethnic used to call them "Ngiao" which implied to racism, in terms of insincere and tricky people. Therefore, Tai Yai cultures in the Northern Thailand of Thailand compose of the word ngiao in the end of their names. Tai Yai was the only ethnic that consumed rice, apart from other ethnics who preferred sticky rice for the main course. This has made Khao kan chin become one of hardly found Lanna dishes that made with rice.

Preparation
Squeezing the pork with lemongrass leaves can improve the smell before mixing it with rice, minced pork, then adding salt and sugar. Now the puddling rice is ready to be steamed, putting the rice on prepared banana leaves, folding both ends to the middle tightly, and steaming it for half an hour.

Side dishes
It can be served with fried chopped garlic, fried chopped shallot, fried dried bird chilies, onions, and cucumber. Also, it can be served as a side dish of nam ngiao.

References

Northern Thai cuisine